The David di Donatello for Best Foreign Film is a category in the David di Donatello Awards, described as "Italy’s answer to the Oscars", presented annually by the Accademia del Cinema Italiano (ACI, Academy of Italian Cinema) since the 1959 edition.
The category is specifically for films not competing for European honours. No awards were granted during the 1960 and 1961 editions, from 1965 to 1971, and in 1981.
Starting from the 2019 edition, the award also includes films that previously would have belonged to the category of Best Film in the European Union.

Winners and nominees
Winners are indicated in bold.

1950s-1960s
1958 The Prince and the Showgirl, directed by Laurence Olivier
1959 Gigi, directed by Vincente Minnelli
1960 No Award
1961 Ben Hur, directed by William Wyler
1962 Judgment at Nuremberg, directed by Stanley Kramer
1963 The Longest Day, produced by  Darryl F. Zanuck
1964 Lawrence of Arabia, directed by  David Lean
1965 My Fair Lady, directed by  George Cukor
1966 The Agony and the Ecstasy, directed by Carol Reed
1967 Doctor Zhivago, directed by David Lean
1968 Guess Who's Coming to Dinner, directed by Stanley Kramer
1969 2001: A Space Odyssey, directed by Stanley Kubrick

1970s
1970 The Lion in Winter, directed by Anthony Harvey
1971 Ryan's Daughter, directed by David Lean
1972 The French Connection, directed by William Friedkin
1973 The Godfather, directed by Francis Ford Coppola
1974 Jesus Christ Superstar, directed by Norman Jewison
1975 The Towering Inferno, directed by Irwin Allen
1976 Nashville, directed by Robert Altman
1977 Marathon Man, directed by John Schlesinger
1978 Close Encounters of the Third Kind, directed by Steven Spielberg
1979 The Wishing Tree (ნატვრის ხე / Natvris khe), directed by Tengiz Abuladze

1980s
1980
 Kramer vs. Kramer, directed by Robert Benton
1981
 No Award
1982
 Mephisto, directed by István Szabó
 Marianne and Juliane (Die bleierne Zeit), directed by Margarethe von Trotta
 Reds, directed by Warren Beatty
1983
 Gandhi, directed by Richard Attenborough
 The Way  (Yol), directed by Yılmaz Güney
 Victor/Victoria, directed by Blake Edwards
 Missing, directed by Costa-Gavras
1984
 Fanny and Alexander, directed by Ingmar Bergman
 Terms of Endearment, directed by James L. Brooks
 Zelig, directed by Woody Allen
1985
 Amadeus, directed by Miloš Forman
 The Killing Fields, directed by Roland Joffé
 Paris, Texas, directed by Wim Wenders
1986
 Out of Africa, directed by Sydney Pollack
 Another Time, Another Place, directed by Michael Radford
 Ran (乱), directed by Akira Kurosawa
1987
 A Room with a View, directed by James Ivory
 The Official Story (La historia oficial), directed by Luis Puenzo
 The Mission, directed by Roland Joffé
1988
 Au revoir les enfants, directed by Louis Malle
 The Dead, directed by John Huston
 Full Metal Jacket, directed by Stanley Kubrick
1989
 Rain Man, directed by Barry Levinson
 Mississippi Burning, directed by Alan Parker
 Women on the Verge of a Nervous Breakdown (Mujeres al borde de un ataque de nervios), directed by Pedro Almodóvar

1990s
1990
 Dead Poets Society, directed by Peter Weir
 Crimes and Misdemeanors, directed by  Woody Allen
 May Fools (Milou en mai), directed by Louis Malle
 Reunion, directed by  Jerry Schatzberg
 Life and Nothing But (La vie et rien d'autre), directed by  Bertrand Tavernier
1991
 Cyrano de Bergerac, directed by Jean-Paul Rappeneau (ex aequo)Hamlet, directed by Franco Zeffirelli (ex aequo)
 Dances with Wolves, directed by Kevin Costner
 Nikita, directed by Luc Besson
 Goodfellas, directed by Martin Scorsese
1992
 Raise the Red Lantern (Dà Hóng Dēnglóng Gāogāo Guà / 大紅燈籠高高掛), directed by Zhang Yimou
 Thelma & Louise, directed by Ridley Scott
 Shadows and Fog, directed by Woody Allen
1993
 A Heart in Winter (Un coeur en hiver), directed by Claude Sautet
 Howards End, directed by James Ivory
 The Crying Game, directed by Neil Jordan
1994
 In the Name of the Father, directed by Jim Sheridan
 The Remains of the Day, directed by James Ivory
 Schindler's List, directed by Steven Spielberg
1995
 Pulp Fiction, directed by Quentin Tarantino
 Forrest Gump, directed by Robert Zemeckis
 Burnt by the Sun (Утомлённые солнцем / Utomlyonnye solntsem), directed by Nikita Mikhalkov
1996
 Nelly and Mr. Arnaud (Nelly et Monsieur Arnaud), directed by Claude Sautet
 Mighty Aphrodite, directed by Woody Allen
 Smoke, directed by Wayne Wang
1997
 Ridicule, directed by Patrice Leconte
1998
 The Full Monty, directed by Peter Cattaneo
 Amistad, directed by Steven Spielberg
 The Thief (Vor), directed by Pavel Chukhray
1999
 Train of Life (Train de vie), directed by Radu Mihaileanu
 Shakespeare in Love, directed by John Madden
 Central Station (Central do Brasil), directed by Walter Salles

2000s
2000
 All About My Mother (Todo sobre mi madre), directed by Pedro Almodóvar
 American Beauty, directed by Sam Mendes
 East Is East, directed by Damien O'Donnell
2001
 The Taste of Others (Le goût des autres), directed by Agnès Jaoui
 Billy Elliot, directed by Stephen Daldry
 Chocolat, directed by Lasse Hallström
 In the Mood for Love (花樣年華 / Fa yeung nin wa), directed by Wong Kar-wai
2002
 The Man Who Wasn't There, directed by Joel Coen and Ethan Coen
 Amélie (Le fabuleux destin d'Amélie Poulain), directed by Jean-Pierre Jeunet
 No Man's Land (Ničija zemlja), directed by Danis Tanović
2003
 The Pianist, directed by Roman Polanski
 Chicago, directed by Rob Marshall
 Talk to Her (Hable con ella), directed by Pedro Almodóvar
 The Hours, directed by Stephen Daldry
 The Man on the Train (L'homme du train), directed by Patrice Leconte
2004
 The Barbarian Invasions (Les Invasions barbares), directed by Denys Arcand
 Big Fish, directed by Tim Burton
 Lost in Translation, directed by Sofia Coppola
 Master and Commander: The Far Side of the World, directed by Peter Weir
 Mystic River, directed by Clint Eastwood
2005
 Million Dollar Baby, directed by Clint Eastwood
 2046, directed by Wong Kar-wai
 3-Iron (빈집 / Binjip), directed by Kim Ki-duk
 Hotel Rwanda, directed by Terry George
 Ray, directed by Taylor Hackford
2006
 Crash, directed by Paul Haggis
 A History of Violence, directed by David Cronenberg
 Good Night, and Good Luck., directed by George Clooney
 Brokeback Mountain, directed by Ang Lee
 Tsotsi, directed by Gavin Hood
2007
 Babel, directed by Alejandro González Iñárritu
 Letters from Iwo Jima, directed by Clint Eastwood
 Little Miss Sunshine, directed by Jonathan Dayton and Valerie Faris
 The Pursuit of Happyness, directed by Gabriele Muccino
 The Departed, directed by Martin Scorsese
2008
 No Country for Old Men, directed by Joel Coen and Ethan Coen
 Across the Universe, directed by Julie Taymor
 Into the Wild, directed by Sean Penn
 In the Valley of Elah, directed by Paul Haggis
 There Will Be Blood, directed by Paul Thomas Anderson
2009
 Gran Torino, directed by Clint Eastwood
 Milk, directed by Gus Van Sant
 The Visitor, directed by Tom McCarthy
 The Wrestler, directed by Darren Aronofsky
 WALL-E, directed by Andrew Stanton

2010s
2010
 Inglourious Basterds, directed by Quentin Tarantino
 A Serious Man, directed by Joel Coen and Ethan Coen
 Avatar, directed by James Cameron
 Invictus, directed by Clint Eastwood
 Up in the Air, directed by Jason Reitman
2011
 Hereafter, directed by Clint Eastwood
 Black Swan, directed by Darren Aronofsky
 Inception, directed by Christopher Nolan
 Incendies, directed by Denis Villeneuve
 The Social Network, directed by David Fincher
2012
 A Separation (جدایی نادر از سیمین / Jodaí-e Nadér az Simín), directed by Asghar Farhadi
 Drive, directed by Nicolas Winding Refn
 Hugo, directed by Martin Scorsese
 The Ides of March, directed by George Clooney
 The Tree of Life, directed by Terrence Malick
2013
 Django Unchained, directed by Quentin Tarantino
 Argo, directed by Ben Affleck
 Silver Linings Playbook, directed by David O. Russell
 Lincoln, directed by Steven Spielberg
 Life of Pi, directed by Ang Lee
2014
 The Grand Budapest Hotel, directed by Wes Anderson
 12 Years a Slave, directed by Steve McQueen
 American Hustle, directed by David O. Russell
 Blue Jasmine, directed by Woody Allen
 The Wolf of Wall Street, directed by Martin Scorsese
2015
 Birdman, directed by Alejandro González Iñárritu
 American Sniper, directed by Clint Eastwood
 Boyhood, directed by Richard Linklater
 The Salt of the Earth, directed by Wim Wenders
 Mommy, directed by Xavier Dolan
2016
 Bridge of Spies, directed by Steven Spielberg
 Carol, directed by Todd Haynes
 Inside Out, directed by Pete Docter
 Remember, directed by Atom Egoyan
 Spotlight, directed by Thomas McCarthy
2017
 Nocturnal Animals, directed by Tom Ford
 Captain Fantastic, directed by Matt Ross
 Lion, directed by Garth Davis
 Paterson, directed by Jim Jarmusch
 Sully, directed by Clint Eastwood
2018
 Dunkirk, directed by Christopher Nolan
 La La Land, directed by Damien Chazelle
 The Insult (قضية رقم ٢٣, / Qadiyya raqm 23), directed by Ziad Doueiri
 Loveless (Нелюбовь / Nelyubov), directed by Andrey Zvyagintsev
 Manchester by the Sea, directed by Kenneth Lonergan
2019
 Roma, directed by Alfonso Cuarón
 Bohemian Rhapsody, directed by Bryan Singer
 Cold War (Zimna wojna), directed by Paweł Pawlikowski
 Phantom Thread, directed by Paul Thomas Anderson
 Three Billboards Outside Ebbing, Missouri, directed by Martin McDonagh

2020s
2020
 Parasite (기생충 / Gisaengchung), directed by Bong Joon-ho
 Once Upon a Time in Hollywood, directed by Quentin Tarantino
 Green Book, directed by Peter Farrelly
 Joker, directed by Todd Phillips
 An Officer and a Spy (J'accuse), directed by Roman Polanski

2021
 1917, directed by Sam Mendes
 Les Misérables, directed by Ladj Ly
 Jojo Rabbit, directed by Taika Waititi
 Richard Jewell, directed by Clint Eastwood
 Sorry We Missed You, directed by Ken Loach

2022
 Belfast, directed by Kenneth Branagh
 Don't Look Up, directed by Adam McKay
 Drive My Car (ドライブ・マイ・カー / Doraibu mai kā), directed by Ryusuke Hamaguchi
 Dune, directed by Denis Villeneuve
 The Power of the Dog, directed by Jane Campion

Awards by nation

Notes

References

External links
 
 David di Donatello official website

David di Donatello
Film awards for Best Foreign Language Film